Pablo Nicolás Vivanco Gutiérrez (born 23 November 1989) is an Argentine former footballer who played as a midfielder.

Football career
Born in Neuquén, Patagonia, Vivanco graduated from Spanish club Elche CF's youth setup, and made his senior debuts for the reserves in 2008 in the regional leagues. In the 2010 summer he moved to another reserve team, Real Murcia Imperial of the Tercera División.

On 23 May 2012, Vivanco made his debut with the first team of the latter, starting in a 0–1 home loss against SD Huesca in the Segunda División. In June, he was loaned to Segunda División B club CD Olímpic de Xàtiva.

After appearing rarely, Vivanco returned to Murcia and terminated his contract, signing with Orihuela CF on 31 January 2013. He appeared in eight matches for the latter during the 2012–13 season, which finished in relegation, and renewed his link on 12 July.

On 5 July 2014, Vivanco joined neighbouring CD Eldense, newly promoted to the third level.

After a serious knee injury, Vivanco retired as footballer on 12 March 2021.

References

External links

1989 births
Living people
People from Neuquén
Argentine footballers
Association football midfielders
Segunda División players
Segunda División B players
Tercera División players
Elche CF Ilicitano footballers
Real Murcia Imperial players
Real Murcia players
CD Olímpic de Xàtiva footballers
Orihuela CF players
CD Eldense footballers
Mérida AD players
Yeclano Deportivo players
Argentine expatriate footballers
Expatriate footballers in Spain
Argentine expatriate sportspeople in Spain